The Yugoslav Women's Handball Championship was the premier championship for women's handball clubs in SFR Yugoslavia. Founded like its male counterpart in 1953, it was dissolved in 1992 following the breakup of Yugoslavia. 

The championship's most successful teams were Radnički Belgrade with fourteen championships (including ten titles in a row) and Lokomotiva Zagreb with ten. Budućnost Titograd follows with four titles, while Spartak Subotica won three, and Lokomotiva Virovitica, Podravka Koprivnica and Voždovac Belgrade clinched two.

The teams from the championship were successful in international competitions, most notably Radnički Belgrade winning three European Cups and three Cup Winners' Cups. ŽRK Osijek and ŽRK Split also won the Cup Winners' Cup and ŽRK Trešnjevka and Lokomotiva Zagreb did the same in the EHF Cup, while Budućnost Titograd won both competitions.

List of champions

 1953 Mirko Kljajić
 1954 Železničar Belgrade
 1955 Lokomotiva Virovitica
 1956 Lokomotiva Zagreb
 1957 Spartak Subotica
 1958 Lokomotiva Virovitica
 1959 Lokomotiva Zagreb
 1960 Spartak Subotica
 1961 BSK Belgrade
 1962 Lokomotiva Zagreb
 1963 Spartak Subotica
 1964 Lokomotiva Zagreb
 1965 Lokomotiva Zagreb
 1966 Podravka Koprivnica

 1967 Podravka Koprivnica
 1968 Lokomotiva Zagreb
 1969 Lokomotiva Zagreb
 1970 Lokomotiva Zagreb
 1971 Voždovac Belgrade
 1972 Radnički Belgrade
 1973 Radnički Belgrade
 1974 Lokomotiva Zagreb
 1975 Radnički Belgrade
 1976 Radnički Belgrade
 1977 Radnički Belgrade
 1978 Radnički Belgrade
 1979 Radnički Belgrade
 1980 Radnički Belgrade

 1981 Radnički Belgrade
 1982 Radnički Belgrade
 1983 Radnički Belgrade
 1984 Radnički Belgrade
 1985 Budućnost Titograd
 1986 Radnički Belgrade
 1987 Radnički Belgrade
 1988 Voždovac Belgrade
 1989 Budućnost Titograd
 1990 Budućnost Titograd
 1991 Lokomotiva Zagreb
 1992 Budućnost Titograd

References

Wom
Defunct women's handball leagues
Handball women